Aunou may refer to two communes in France:
 Aunou-le-Faucon, in the Orne department
 Aunou-sur-Orne, in the Orne department